Tooting Bec Football Club is a football club based in Tooting Bec, Greater London, England.

History
The club was established in 2004 and joined the Junior Division Two of the Surrey South Eastern Combination. A fourth-place finish in their first season saw the club promotion to Junior Division One. The following season the club were Junior Division One runners-up, earning promotion to Intermediate Division Two. They finished third in the division in 2007–08, earning promotion to Division One. They went on to win Division One and the League Shield in 2009–10, after which the club joined the Surrey Elite Intermediate League. In 2016–17 they were Surrey Elite Intermediate League runners-up.

The 2017–18 season saw Tooting Bec win the Surrey Elite Intermediate League, earning promotion to Division One of the Combined Counties League. At the end of the 2020–21 season the club were transferred to Division One of the Southern Counties East League.

Ground
The club played at Fishponds Lane in Tooting during their first season, before moving to Prince Georges Playing Fields in Raynes Park. They later relocated to Tooting & Mitcham's Imperial Fields ground. Ahead of the 2022–23 season the club announced a groundshare agreement with Chipstead.

Honours
Surrey Elite Intermediate League
Champions 2017–18
Surrey South-Eastern Combination
Division One champions 2009–10
League Shield winners 2009–10

Records
Best FA Vase performance: First qualifying round, 2017–18

References

External links
Official website

Football clubs in England
Football clubs in London
Association football clubs established in 2004
2004 establishments in England
Surrey South Eastern Combination
Surrey Elite Intermediate Football League
Combined Counties Football League
Southern Counties East Football League